Crambe is a village and civil parish in the Ryedale district of North Yorkshire, England. The population as of the 2011 census was less than 100. Details are included in the civil parish of Whitwell-on-the-Hill. The village is located in the Howardian Hills Area of Outstanding Natural Beauty. The father of the renowned mathematician Karl Pearson was born in the village.

History
Crambe is mentioned in the Domesday Book as "Cranbone" in the Bulford Hundred. There were two manors of land in the parish at that time. One belonged to Sumarlithi, son of Karli, which was passed to the King and then to Robert Brus, and the other to Earl Waltheof, which was given to Count Robert of Mortain following the execution in 1076 of the Earl. The lands have also been in the ownership of Walter Percehay, before both areas of land being joined at some time in the sixteenth century. From that time, the land has been owned by Thomas Bamburgh (of Howsham); Sir John Wentworth and his descendants to 1741; thence to the Cholmely family and to Sir George Strickland.

The name of the village is derived from the Anglo-Saxon word crumb, meaning "a bend in the river".

The village was served by Howsham railway station on the York to Scarborough Line between 1845 and 1849, though it is shown as "Crambe station" on Moule's 1850s maps of North and East Yorkshire.

School
The school at Crambe was built by local landowner Colonel Cholmley of Howsham in 1841 and is a Grade II listed building. The small single storey building was one of many erected by the Colonel and his wife during the 19th century, such as the Cholmley School in Whitby, the family's old seat. The Cholmley's are related to the ancient family of Cholmondeley in Cheshire. The school is no longer in use.

Governance
Crambe is part of the Thirsk and Malton UK Parliament constituency. It lies within the Hovingham and Sheriff Hutton electoral district of North Yorkshire County Council. It is also part of the Ryedale South West ward of Ryedale District Council.

Geography

The nearest settlements to Crambe are Kirkham  to the north-east; Whitwell-on-the-Hill  to the north-west; Barton Hill  to the south-west and Howsham  to the south. It is also near Kirkham Priory, Howsham Hall, and Castle Howard.

Religion
The village church, dedicated to St Michael, was originally built in the Norman period and partially restored at a later date.

References

External links

Crambe.net
 Crambe and area in 1807 at Manchester Art Gallery; by John Nattes.
 Crambe Beck Bridge in 1805; by John Sell Cotman (1805).

Villages in North Yorkshire
Civil parishes in North Yorkshire